The  (Replacement) Triglav  class consisted of four destroyers built for the Austro-Hungarian Navy during the First World War. Completed late in the war, they saw little action; three ships were seized by Italy and one by France as war reparations in 1920.

Background and description
The loss of two s in the 1st Battle of Durazzo in 1915 caused the Austro-Hungarian Navy to begin construction of four improved versions of the Tátras the following year named Triglav, Lika, Dukla and Uzsok.

The ships had a complement of 114 officers and enlisted men.

The destroyers were powered by two AEG-Curtiss steam turbine sets, each driving a single  propeller using steam provided by six Yarrow boilers. Four of the boilers were oil-fired while the remaining pair used coal, although oil was sprayed onto the coal to increase power.

The main armament of the Ersatz Triglav-class destroyers consisted of two 50-caliber Škoda Works  K11 guns, one each fore and aft of the superstructure in single mounts. Their secondary armament consisted of four 45-caliber  K09 TAG ( (anti-torpedo boat guns)). Two additional guns were placed on anti-aircraft mountings. They were also equipped with four  torpedo tubes in two twin rotating mountings aft of the funnels. Two spare torpedoes were stored on the main deck.

After the war, three vessels—Triglav, Lika, and Uzsok—were ceded to Italy and one, Dukla, to France. The last vessels were scrapped in 1939.

Citations

Bibliography 
 

 

 

 
 

 
Destroyers of the Austro-Hungarian Navy
Destroyer classes
World War I destroyers of Austria-Hungary
Ship classes of the French Navy